Nicole ("Nickey") Carroll  (born 14 January 1972) is a former Australian long-distance runner who competed in the marathon at the 2000 Summer Olympics. In 1999, Carroll set a course record of 2:29:21 while winning the California International Marathon.

Achievements

References

External links
Profile at www.sports-reference.com
Interview at www.runcim.org

1972 births
Living people
Australian female long-distance runners
Athletes (track and field) at the 2000 Summer Olympics
Olympic athletes of Australia
Australian Institute of Sport track and field athletes
20th-century Australian women
21st-century Australian women